The Metropolitan Transportation Authority Police Department (MTAPD) is the police agency of New York's Metropolitan Transportation Authority

MTA police officers are fully empowered under the New York State Public Authorities Law and are commissioned in the state of Connecticut. Their geographic area of employment extends to all counties in New York served by the Metropolitan Transportation Authority, giving officers the ability to exercise full police authority within the counties of Dutchess, Putnam, Orange, Rockland, Westchester, Nassau, Suffolk, and in New York City.

The MTA Police Department is the primary railroad police agency in New York State and Connecticut. The New York City subways are patrolled by the NYPD Transit Bureau under contract since 1994.

Since 2019, the MTA Police has officers conducting daily subway patrols in New York City in an effort to assist the NYPD in addressing quality of life issues, like homelessness, that affect commuters.

History

The department was formed on January 1, 1998, with the consolidation of the Long Island Rail Road Police Department and the Metro-North Railroad Police Department. Since 9/11, the department has expanded in size and has ramped up dramatically its counter-terrorism capabilities, adding canine teams and emergency services officers. There is one lieutenant, four sergeants, and 44 police officers who are assigned to the K-9 Unit and serve as handlers with their canine partners.  The department has one of the best trained K-9 units in the United States. At a national competition in 2013, two MTA Police dogs took third and fourth place in explosives detection.

Currently, training for new recruits is conducted at the New York City Police Academy. After successfully completing the academy curriculum, officers are further trained in Connecticut law and law enforcement procedures.

Staten Island
On June 1, 2005, the Staten Island Rapid Transit Police Department, with 25 officers, was merged into the MTA Police Department.  The Staten Island Rapid Transit Police Department was responsible for policing the Staten Island Rapid Transit System in the borough of Staten Island in New York City.  This was the final step in consolidating MTA agency law enforcement, and increased the total workforce of the department to 716, including civilians.

New York City Subway
On September 12, 2019, the MTA announced the addition of 500 MTAPD officers to patrol the New York City Subway, nearly doubling the 783 officers previously employed by the MTAPD. This came shortly after Governor Andrew Cuomo directed the MTA to solve the issue of homelessness in the subway system.

After criticism of multiple high-profile arrests, multiple MTA board members expressed concerns over the added police presence, citing the high cost of personnel, estimated at $249 million over four years.

Acceditation
On the 3 March 2016 the MTAPD attained accreditation status from the New York State Department of Criminal Justice Services Accreditation Council.

Structure

On June 29, 2022, former Yonkers Police Department Commissioner John Mueller was appointed as the sixth Chief of Police.

The structure of the MTA Police is made up of the following senior officers:

 Chief of Police ("4-star" rank) - head of the MTAPD
 Chief of Operations, Administration ("3-star" rank) - second in command and in charge of operations
 Assistant Chief of Special Services ("2-star" rank) - third in command and in charge of special services

Below them rank the rest of the department (see rank structure below) of approximately 1000 police officers.

Officers serve across the transit system and in various departments (see below).

Ranks of Department

The following is a list of all of the ranks of the MTA Police Department:

Rank insignia for Sergeant and Detective Sergeant (when in uniform) is worn on the upper sleeves of the shirt and jacket while rank insignia for Lieutenant through Chief of Department is worn on the collars of the shirt and the shoulders of the jacket.

Power and authority

MTAPD officers are New York State police officers according to New York State Criminal Procedure Law, §1.20(34). This means they have police powers powers, within New York State.

Officers are also commissioned officers in Connecticut, as MTAPD works in Connecticut (see above section).

Uniforms and equipment

Despite being a state (or inter-state) law enforcement agency, MTAPD officers wear similar uniform to NYPD personnel.

This includes:

dark blue shirt with metal badge and collar pins
dark blue trousers
tie
jacket and coat
eight-point blue peaked cap, with cap-badge
duty belt
bullet-resistant vest
equipment vest
boots

The ESU and Hybrid Threat Unit wears a less formal version without metal badges and pins, and with writing on their shirts and jackets, with no "shield".

A variety of vests, gloves and other appropriate gear for the season/duty can be worn, such as traffic vests.

MTAPD officers are all armed with a pistol and also carry:

Taser
Expandable baton
OC spray
Handcuffs
Radio that is linked with central despatch and other officers
notebooks and pens.

All officers wear a police badge (known in New York as a "shield") on their left chest, in regular and ceremonial uniform. The colour and style changes with rank.

Districts

There are currently 11 police districts within the MTA Police Department:

Specialized units

The department has the following specialized units (details):

 Canine (K-9) Unit - provides special police dog support
 Computer Crimes Unit
 Emergency Services Unit - police officers, with special equipment, who are trained for a variety of serious emergencies. Similar to the units of the Port Authority Police and New York City Police.
 Detective Division - investigates serious crimes to do with MTA
 Highway Unit also known as "Highway Patrol" - patrols and protects the MTA bridges, highways, tunnels and other roads.
 Homeless Assistance Unit
 Interagency Counterterrorism Task Force - works with other New York state and city agencies.
 Discovery Unit
 Executive Protection Unit
 Hybrid Threat Unit
 Fare Evasion Task Force
 Body Worn Camera Unit
 Communications Unit
 Emergency Operations
 Internal Affairs Bureau
 Technology & System Development
 Right of Way Task Force
 Training Unit
 Applicant Investigations

Patrolman's Benevolent Association

The MTAPD has a Patrolman's Benevolent Association, which is a union for the MTA Police officers, from the ranks of "Officer" to "Lieutenant" inclusive.

The MTA website states:

Social media

The MTAPD has a Twitter account, that it uses to disseminate useful information for users of the MTA.

See also 
List of law enforcement agencies in New York
Port Authority of New York and New Jersey Police Department
New Jersey Transit Police Department
New York City Transit Police (does not exist, absorbed into NYPD in 1995)
Transit police

References

External links

Transit police departments of the United States
Metropolitan Transportation Authority
Specialist police departments of New York (state)
Specialist police departments of Connecticut
Law enforcement agencies of New York City